This is a list of current routes operated by the mass transit agency King County Metro in the Greater Seattle area. It includes routes directly operated by the agency, routes operated by contractors and routes operated by King County Metro under contract with another agency. Routes are organized by route number (or letters in the case of RapidRide). Discontinued routes and former versions of existing routes are not listed.

These lists reflect the March 2023 service change.

RapidRide

King County Metro's RapidRide lines are designated by letters. RapidRide routes also have a numerical designation in the range 671-676, but this is not displayed to passengers.

1–99 (Seattle)

These routes run mostly within the city of Seattle. 
 Trolley routes may be operated by electric trolleybuses.
 Conventional routes are not operated by trolleybuses, but are instead operated by diesel, diesel-electric hybrid, or battery-electric buses. All bus routes in other sections of this page are conventional routes.

Route 90 (Snow Shuttle)

Route 90 operates when snow routes are in effect in the Central Seattle area, and when the Emergency Service Network has been activated due to severe weather. Route 90 buses travel between Downtown Seattle and First Hill, via Capitol Hill, serving all marked stops along the route from approximately 5:30 a.m. to 11:30 p.m.

Route 96 & 98 (Seattle Streetcar)

Route 97 (Link Shuttle)

King County Metro operates Route 97 when service on Sound Transit's Central Link Light Rail is suspended for a prolonged period of time. If the entire line is closed, Route 97 buses emulate trains, stopping at every station along the line. If only a section of the line is closed, Route 97 buses serve as a "bus bridge" shuttling passengers between the operating sections of the line and stopping near intermediate stations on the closed section of the line, in the case of a multi-station closure. Limited stop variants of route 97 may also be operated in the case of a multi-station closure.

100s (South King County)

Routes in the 100 series primarily serve destinations in South King County and on Vashon Island.

200s (East King County)

Routes in the 200s primarily serve East King County.

300s (North King County)

Routes in the 300s serve North King County which includes Shoreline, Lake Forest Park, Kenmore, Bothell, Woodinville and Duvall.

400s (Community Transit Commuter - Seattle)

Routes in this series are reserved for Community Transit's commuter routes connecting Downtown Seattle and Snohomish County.

500s (Sound Transit Express)

Routes in this series are Sound Transit Express routes with the exception of Pierce Transit routes 500 and 501 serving Federal Way. This list shows the routes Metro operates under contract to Sound Transit, it does not include routes operated by Community Transit or Pierce Transit (who operates some routes solely within King County).

600s (Community Shuttle and Trailhead Direct)

This series of numbers is used for routes considered temporary or experimental. Currently community shuttle routes use these numbers. These routes are operated using Metro owned minibuses, operated by drivers from the non-profit Hopelink and partially funded by the communities they serve. While all routes operate on a fixed route, they also offer a flexible service area where passengers can be picked up and dropped off, if they make a reservation in advance.

The 600s are also used for the Trailhead Direct shuttle system, which runs on weekends and holidays during the spring and summer.

700s (West Seattle Water Taxi shuttle)

These routes are shuttles connecting neighborhoods West Seattle to the Seacrest Park King County Water Taxi terminal for service to Pier 50 on downtown Seattle's waterfront. They serve all posted bus stops along the route. Although both are classified as DART (Dial-a-Ride Transit) routes, only route 773 has a zone where during weekday mid-day trips buses may deviate from their route. During the winter months (late October to early April) mid-day and weekend service is suspended on the West Seattle Water Taxi and on the shuttle routes.

Routes in the 700s are also used for special event services, such as Washington Huskies football games at Husky Stadium.

800s (Custom & Community Transit Commuter - UW )

Both Community Transit and King County Metro operate routes in the 800s, but the numbers used by the two agencies do not overlap. 
King County Metro assigns custom bus routes serving schools in Bellevue, Kirkland and on Mercer Island route numbers in the 800s. Metro provides one peak trip each school day.
For commuter routes connecting the University of Washington and Snohomish County, operated by Community Transit, see List of Community Transit Bus Routes.

900s (DART & Custom)

Dial-A-Ride-Transit services are assigned route numbers 900-939. Custom bus routes are assigned route numbers from 950-999. The King County Water Taxi uses route numbers 973 and 975. Currently routes serving the private Lakeside School and University Prep in Seattle are assigned route numbers 980-999.

Non-numbered Routes
Although some of the following routes have internal route numbers, they do not operate with traditional route numbers displayed on the coach

References

External links
 King County Metro routes by neighborhood
 Metro Service Frequency

King County Metro
Sound Transit
Bus transportation in Washington (state)
Transportation in King County, Washington
Transportation in Seattle
Bus routes, Seattle
bus routes